is a Japanese footballer playing for Briobecca Urayasu.

Career
After playing for the football team of Meiji University, Uematsu joined Briobecca Urayasu in January 2014. After four seasons, Uematsu moved to Gainare Tottori to play professional football in J3 League.

In 2021, after leaving Tottori, he returned to his former club Briobecca Urayasu, after 4 years since his short-lasted departure. On 27 November 2022, he scored Briobecca's third goal at the 87th minute, helping his side to comfortably lead a 3–1 win against Tochigi City FC at the 2022 Japanese Regional Football Champions League. This win allowed Briobecca to win the tournament's title for the first time in history, and promoted them to the 2023 Japan Football League.

Club statistics
.

Honours
 Briobecca Urayasu
Japanese Regional Football Champions League: 2022

References

External links

Profile at J. League
Profile at Gainare Tottori

1991 births
Living people
Association football people from Kyoto Prefecture
Japanese footballers
Japan Football League players
J3 League players
Briobecca Urayasu players
Gainare Tottori players
Association football midfielders